Vinagarra laichowensis is a species of ray-finned fish in the genus Vinagarra.

References 

Vinagarra
Fish described in 1969